St Mary's Church, Osterley is a Church of England church on Osterley Road in Osterley, London Borough of Hounslow.

Designed by John Taylor the Younger in a Neo-Gothic imitation of the Decorated style it was funded by Henry Daniel Davies, who built the Spring Grove estate of which it formed a part. In 1855 it was said that when the church was opened it would be "placed at the disposal of an able and evangelical minister" and has remained in that churchmanship ever since. The church opened in 1856 and was assigned a parish taken from the ancient parish of Isleworth later the same year. Young built it in brick with stone facings and with two tiers of windows ready for the addition of galleries, though these were never needed. The church includes stained-glass windows designed by Alfred Hassam (1842–1869).

In 1875 the parish's living was valued at £459. Davies remained patron of the parish for several years, but eventually its advowson passed to the Church Patronage Society around 1897 Notable events include the 1899 marriage of Sofia Dalgairns, future head of the Metropolitan Police's first Women Patrols. The living was valued at £859 net in 1955–1956. In 1959 a new vicar began a Sunday parish communion service at 9:30 whilst continuing matins at 11, at which time the parish's electoral roll totalled 506. It now forms part of the parish of St Mary's with St Luke's, the latter having opened on Kingsley Road as a Sunday school before 1895 before becoming a mission church (a church of lesser status than a parish church) of St Mary's parish.

References

Church of England church buildings in the London Borough of Hounslow
1856 establishments in England